On August 12, 2021, at 01:46:12 PST, a strong  7.1 earthquake struck the island of Mindanao at a depth of . It perceived Intensity V on the PHIVOLCS Earthquake Intensity Scale. No damage or injuries were reported but a young man was killed by the earthquake.

Tectonic setting 
The Philippines islands were formed in evolutionary processes involving Subductions, and collisions. Earthquakes are frequent there as a result of collision processes between the Philippine Sea Plate (PSP) and the Sunda Plate (SP). The slip convergence between PSP and the SP boundary is obliquely accommodated by the Philippine fault system, which is a major left-lateral strike-slip fault system. The Philippine fault has been slipping at a rate of 33 ± 11 mm/yr in the northern and central Leyte sections. The southern part of the Philippine fault is mainly located in eastern Mindanao and constitutes a complex fault system with discrete strands and splays. Mindanao island is located on the complex collision boundary between the SP and the PSP. Some parts of the convergence between these plates are consumed by the Philippine fault and subduction at the Cotabato trench.

Earthquake 

The earthquake struck near Davao Oriental early on Thursday morning, August 12. PHIVOLCS earlier listed the earthquake as magnitude 7.3 at a depth of 69 kilometers, then revised its advisory to a magnitude 7.2 earthquake, which occurred at a depth of 50 kilometers. It later reverted to its original report of a magnitude 7.3 earthquake. At 6:06 am, PHIVOLCS further revised its report to a magnitude 7.1 earthquake, at a depth of 39 km (kilometers). The United States Geological Survey also measured the quake at 7.1.   

The Philippine Institute of Volcanology and Seismology (PHIVOLCS) reported in a bulletin that the earthquake, which was tectonic in origin, struck at 1:46 am off the coast of Davao Oriental. PHIVOLCS said that there was no tsunami threat but damage and aftershocks were expected. 

Local authorities have deployed personnel to assess structures for any damage and injuries following the earthquake. In Davao City, workers of different businesses went out of their offices due to the earthquake.

Mindanao is regularly rocked by quakes due to its location on the Pacific "Ring of Fire".

Aftershocks ranging in magnitude 4's and 5's followed after the mainshock early morning in Philippines. A moderately strong shallow aftershock was felt at midnight on August 12. The strongest aftershocks were reported magnitude 5.1 and 5.7 intensities of III. The earthquake was felt mostly all over Mindanao and lasted for more than a minute.

Tsunami
A tsunami was generated with recorded wave heights of 6.1 cm at Bitung, Indonesia and 3 cm at Davao City, Philippines.

Other events
An earthquake measuring  a magnitude of 7.0 struck the same location on January 21, 2021. Despite the location, there is no evidence of a casual relationship between these two events due to the long period of time between them.

Damage and casualties 
The Department of Transportation said there were only minor cracks on the runway of the airport in Mati, but no damage to the passenger terminal. There was no damage at Francisco Bangoy International Airport as well as port facilities and public terminals in the region, it added.  Despite that there is no damage reported.  

A 20-year-old man in Tandag died after being hit in the head by falling coconuts following the earthquake.

See also 
 List of earthquakes in 2021
 List of earthquakes in the Philippines
 2021 Davao Del Sur earthquake

References 

Davao
Davao
2021 disasters in the Philippines
2021 in the Philippines
2021 earthquakes in Asia